Xawery Żuławski (born 22 December 1971 in Warsaw) is a Polish film director.

In 1995 he graduated National Film School in Łódź. He is the son of actress Małgorzata Braunek and director Andrzej Żuławski.  His second feature Wojna polsko-ruska (2009), adapted from the controversial best-selling novel by Dorota Masłowska, won First Prize in the New Polish Films competition at the 9th Era New Horizons Film Festival in Wrocław. In 2013, he stated he intends to direct a Polish novel "Zły" by Leopold Tyrmand.

Filmography

Director
 Wiadomość od Jimiego (1993)
 Europe 99euro-films2 (2003)
 Chaos (2006)
 Wojna polsko-ruska (2009), based on a novel by Dorota Masłowska
 Diagnoza (2017), TV series
 Mowa ptaków (2019), based on a screenplay by Andrzej Żuławski

Screenplay
 Wiadomość od Jimiego (1993)
 Europe 99euro-films2 (2003)
 Chaos (2006)
 Wojna polsko-ruska (2009), based on a novel by Dorota Masłowska

Actor
 La Fidélité, as Coureur Speedway (2000)
 Portret podwójny, as Żurek (2000)
 Bellissima (2001)

Family tree

References

External links
 
 Xawery Żuławski at Filmweb 
 Biography at Onet.pl 
 Xawery Żuławski at culture.pl

1971 births
Living people
Polish male film actors
Polish film directors
Polish screenwriters
Łódź Film School alumni
Film people from Warsaw